William Hamilton Reid (25 July 1893 — 17 January 1949) was a Scottish first-class cricketer.

Reid was born at Uddingston in July 1893, where he was educated at Uddingston Grammar School. He in the First World War with the Scottish Rifles, being commissioned as a second lieutenant in April 1917. A club cricketer for Uddingston Cricket Club, Reid was selected to play for Scotland in a first-class cricket match against Ireland at Dublin in 1923. Playing as an off break bowler in the Scottish side, he took figures of 4 for 29 in the Irish first innings, but went wicketless as they followed-on in their second innings. From the tail he was dismissed without scoring in the Scottish first innings by William Pollock, and was unbeaten on 0 in their second innings. Outside of cricket, Reid was a coal agent and shipper. He died in the Pollokshields area of Glasgow in January 1949.

References

External links
 

1893 births
1949 deaths
People from Uddingston
People educated at Uddingston Grammar School
Cameronians officers
British Army personnel of World War I
Scottish cricketers